Veelerveen is a linear village with a population of around 720 in the municipality of Westerwolde in the Netherlands.

History 
In 1968, Veelerveen became part of Bellingwedde. And in 2018, part of Westerwolde.

Geography 
Veelerveen is located in the centre of the municipality of Westerwolde in the east province of Groningen in the northeast of the Netherlands. It is situated in the region of Westerwolde.

In the northwest it is close to the village of Wedde, in the north to Vriescheloo, in the northeast to Bellingwolde, in the southeast to Bourtange, and in the southwest to Vlagtwedde.

The village is a linear settlement alongside the Ruiten-Aa-kanaal and B.L. Tijdenskanaal. The canals Mussel-Aa-kanaal, Ruiten-Aa-kanaal, and B.L. Tijdenskanaal come together at the village centre where the three-way bridge Noabers Badde connects the canal banks.

Demographics 

Attractions 
Nieman's Mill (Gronings: Niemans Meuln) is a smock mill that was built in 1916. It has been listed as a national heritage site since 1972.

References

External links 

  Veelerveen, website about the village

Populated places in Groningen (province)
Westerwolde (municipality)